The 2014–15 Cypriot Second Division was the 60th season of the Cypriot second-level football league and it began on 20 September 2014. There was a new league system in place with the eight teams of the B1 Division, merging with the eight teams of the B2 Division, creating a unified Second Division. Before the season, Alki Larnaca was dissolved due to financial problems and AEK Kouklia and AEP Paphos merged to create Pafos FC, reducing the total of clubs competing from 16 to 14. Enosis Neon Paralimni won their 2nd title.

Team Changes from 2013–14

Teams promoted to 2014–15 Cypriot First Division
 Ayia Napa
 Othellos Athienou

Teams relegated from 2013–14 Cypriot First Division
 AEK Kouklia
 Alki Larnaca 
 Aris Limassol 
 Enosis Neon Paralimni

Teams promoted from 2013–14 Cypriot Third Division
 Elpida Xylofagou
 ENAD Polis Chrysochous

Teams relegated to 2014–15 Cypriot Third Division
 ASIL Lysi
 Chalkanoras Idaliou
 Onisilos Sotira
 PAEEK

Stadia and locations

Note: Table lists clubs in alphabetical order.

League table

References

Sources

Cypriot Second Division seasons
2014–15 in Cypriot football
Cyprus